Statistics of Qatar Stars League for the 1998–99 season.

Overview
It was contested by 9 teams, and Al-Wakrah Sports Club won the championship.

Final league table

Statistics

First round
Obtained from daharchives

Goal statistics
Total goals scored: 112
Fastest goal:  Mohammed Salem Al-Enazi (1:45)
Goal scored latest:  Allen Kamuanga
Top goalscorers:  Mubarak Al Kuwari /  Saleh Fodal /  Akwá /  Mujeeb Hamad (5 goals)

General statistics
Most 'Man of the Match' awards:  Mubarak Mustafa

List of managers

Managerial changes

Foreign player changes
Each club is limited to 2 foreign players.

Foreign players
Each club is limited to 2 foreign players.

References

Qatar – List of final tables (RSSSF)

Qatar
1